Požega-Slavonia County is a Croatian county in western Slavonia. Its capital is Požega. Its population was 78,034 at the 2011 census.

Alongside the City of Zagreb and Bjelovar-Bilogora County, it is one of three Croatian counties that do not border another nation.

Geography

Požega-Slavonia county borders on Bjelovar-Bilogora County in the northwest, Virovitica-Podravina County in the north, Osijek-Baranja County in the northeast, Brod-Posavina County in the south, and Sisak-Moslavina County in the southwest.

Administrative divisions

Požega-Slavonija County is divided into:

 City of Požega (county seat)
 Town of Lipik
 Town of Pakrac
 Town of Kutjevo
 Town of Pleternica
 Municipalities:

Demographics

As of the 2021 census, the county had 64,420 residents. The population density is 35 people per km2.

Ethnic Croats form the majority with 90.4% of the population, followed by Serbs at 6.0%.

See also
Požega County of the Kingdom of Croatia-Slavonia

References

External links

 

 
Slavonia
Counties of Croatia